The Men's scratch was held on 16 October 2014.

Results

References

Men's scratch
European Track Championships – Men's scratch